In music, a rewrite rule is a recursive generative grammar, which creates a chord progression from another.

Steedman (1984) has proposed a set of recursive "rewrite rules" which generate all well-formed transformations of jazz, basic I–IV–I–V–I twelve-bar blues chord sequences, and, slightly modified, non-twelve-bar blues I–IV–V sequences ("rhythm changes").

The typical 12-bar blues progression can be notated

 1   2   3   4     5   6   7   8    9   10  11  12
 I / I / I / I // IV /IV / I / I // V / IV / I / I
where the top line numbers each bar, one slash indicates a bar line, two indicate both a bar line and a phrase ending and a Roman numeral indicates the chord function. 

Important transformations include

replacement or substitution of a chord by its dominant or subdominant:

 1    2   3   4      5     6     7     8      9   10   11  12
 I / IV / I / I7 // IV / VII7 / III7 / VI7 // II7 / V7 / I / I //

use of chromatic passing chords:
   ...7      8     9 ...
 ...III7 / III7 / II7...
and chord alterations such as minor chords, diminished sevenths, etc.
Sequences by fourth, rather than fifth, include Jimi Hendrix's version of "Hey Joe" and Deep Purple's "Hush":

    1            2     3   4        5           6     7   8       9           10    11  12
 VI, III / VII, IV / I / I // VI, III / VII, IV / I / I // VI, III / VII, IV / I / I //
These often result in Aeolian harmony and lack perfect cadences (V–I). Middleton (1990) suggests that both modal and fourth-oriented structures, rather than being, "distortions or surface transformations of Schenker's favoured V-I kernel, are more likely branches of a deeper principle, that of tonic/not-tonic differentiation."

For the  notation, see Borrowed chord.

References

Chord progressions